Jaune may refer to:
Jaune (album), a 1970 album by Jean-Pierre Ferland
Carte Jaune, an international certificate of vaccination
Vin jaune, a type of wine

People with the name
Jaune Quick-To-See Smith, Native American artist
Oda Jaune, Bulgarian painter
Tête Jaune, Iroquois-Métis trapper, fur trader, and explorer

See also
 Yellow